Ram’s horn can mean:

 Shofar, a horn and a musical instrument used for religious purposes
 Bukkehorn, a musical instrument used in Norwegian and other forms of Nordic traditional music
 Proboscidea (plant), a genus of plants
 The IPA letter for the close-mid back unrounded vowel, known as "ram's horns"
 Ram's Horn (restaurant), a Detroit, Michigan family restaurant chain
 Onychogryphosis, a medical condition which produces toenails known as "ram's horn"s